The Miccosukee Methodist Church (also known as the Miccosukee United Methodist Church or Concord Methodist Episcopal Church) is a historic church in Miccosukee, Florida. It is located on County Road 59, south of the junction with State Road 151. On June 28, 1996, it was added to the U.S. National Register of Historic Places.

References

External links
 Leon County listings at National Register of Historic Places
 Florida's Office of Cultural and Historical Programs
 Leon County listings
 Miccosukee Methodist Church

Methodist churches in Florida
National Register of Historic Places in Leon County, Florida
Churches in Leon County, Florida